Mattias Kenneth Ritola (born March 14, 1987) is a former Swedish professional ice hockey forward.

Playing career
Ritola made his debut in Sweden's top-tier SHL with Leksands IF during the 2005-06 season, after being drafted 103rd overall in the fourth round of the 2005 NHL Entry Draft by the Detroit Red Wings. Ritola joined the Red Wings for the 2007-08 season and played his first NHL game on March 15, 2008, against the Nashville Predators. Ritola did not qualify to be engraved on the cup because he did not play in a post-season game, but he was awarded a Stanley Cup ring, and he was included on the 2008 Detroit Red Wings Stanley Cup picture. Ritola played in his first post-season game on May 6, 2010, in a 7–1 win over the San Jose Sharks.

On Tuesday October 6, 2010, Ritola was claimed off waivers by the Tampa Bay Lightning. He scored his first NHL goal on October 30, 2010, against Ilya Bryzgalov of the Phoenix Coyotes. In late 2010, he was diagnosed with the Meniere's disease. Early in November 2011, Ritola cleared regular waivers and was assigned to Norfolk Admirals of the American Hockey League, however Ritola refused to report to the AHL club. On November 9, 2011, Ritola cleared unconditional waivers and his contract with Tampa Bay was terminated so he would be free to pursue playing opportunities in Europe. On November 10, 2011, Modo Hockey announced that he signed a contract to play until the 2012–13 season of Elitserien. His contract was extended to the 2015–16 season on January 4, 2013.

During the 2014–15 season, after 10 games with Modo, Ritola transferred to return to his original and fellow SHL club, Leksands IF on October 13, 2014. After spending the 2014-15 season with Leksands, he moved on to another SHL side, Skellefteå AIK. He was a regular on a Skellefteå squad that progressed to the SHL finals, where they were beaten by Frölunda HC.

On May 31, 2016, he signed a two-year deal with HC Fribourg-Gottéron of the Swiss National League A (NLA) and left the club on January 18, 2017, due to personal reasons. He returned to Leksands IF shortly after parting ways with Fribourg.

Career statistics

Regular season and playoffs

International

References

External links

1987 births
Living people
Detroit Red Wings draft picks
Detroit Red Wings players
HC Fribourg-Gottéron players
Grand Rapids Griffins players
IFK Arboga IK players
Leksands IF players
Modo Hockey players
People from Borlänge Municipality
Skellefteå AIK players
Stanley Cup champions
Swedish ice hockey right wingers
Swedish people of Finnish descent
Tampa Bay Lightning players
People with Ménière's Disease
Sportspeople from Dalarna County